The Board of Engineers Malaysia (abbrev: BEM) is a statutory authority founded in 1972 representing the engineering profession in Malaysia. It has around 101,478 members as of 2016 who are either engineers or have a special interest in engineering in Malaysia. The institution aims to raise the prestige of the engineering as well as those involved in the field.

BEM is under the administration of the Ministry of Works (Malaysia) and established under the Registration of Engineers Act 1967. The institute is responsible for the maintenance of the registration of engineering Graduates and Professional Engineers. In addition, BEM also serves as the controller that determines conduct and ethics for those involved with engineering in Malaysia.

References

References 
 BEM official website

1972 establishments in Malaysia
Engineering organizations
Federal ministries, departments and agencies of Malaysia
Government agencies established in 1972
Ministry of Works (Malaysia)
Professional associations based in Malaysia
Professional titles and certifications
Engineering education
Accreditation organizations